Jerry Skotadis (born 7 March 2000), is an Australian professional footballer who plays as a defensive midfielder for Macarthur FC.

Club career

Sydney FC
On 21 May 2019, Skotadis made his professional debut in the 2019 AFC Champions League in a group stage match against Kawasaki Frontale, replacing Cameron Devlin in the 84th minute as they went on to lose 4–0, being eliminated from the competition.

Western United
On 19 October 2019, Skotadis signed a scholarship contract with Western United for the 2019–20 season. He made his debut in United's Round 9 clash against Melbourne Victory, playing the full 90 minutes in the 3–1 win. On 24 January 2020, after 6 A-League appearances, he penned a two-year contract extension with Western United. Two days later, he provided the assist for Alessandro Diamanti's equaliser in a 4–3 loss to Adelaide United at Coopers Stadium.

Honours
Macarthur
Australia Cup: 2022

References

External links

2000 births
Living people
Australian soccer players
Association football midfielders
Western Sydney Wanderers FC players
Sydney FC players
Western United FC players
Macarthur FC players
National Premier Leagues players
Australian people of Greek descent